The 1975 Scotland rugby union tour of New Zealand was a series of seven matches played by the Scotland national rugby union team in New Zealand in May and June 1975. The Scotland team won four of their matches and lost the other three. They lost the only international match against the New Zealand national rugby union team (the All Blacks) in a game played in a downpour on a saturated pitch.

Matches 
Scores and results list Scotland's points tally first.

Touring party
 Manager: George Burrell
 Assistant manager: Bill Dickinson
 Captain: Ian McLauchlan

Backs

 David Bell
 Graham Birkett
 Lewis Dick
 John Frame
 Bruce Hay
 Andy Irvine
 Alan Lawson
 Ian McGeechan
 Dougie Morgan
 Jim Renwick
 Billy Steele
 Colin Telfer

Forwards

 Ian Barnes
 Mike Biggar
 Sandy Carmichael
 Colin Fisher
 Wilson Lauder
 David Leslie
 George Mackie
 Duncan Madsen
 Alastair McHarg
 Ian McLauchlan
 Norman Pender
 Alan Tomes
 Bill Watson

References

Scotland rugby union tour
Scotland national rugby union team tours
Rugby union tours of New Zealand
Scottish-New Zealand culture
tour
tour